Operation Compass (also ) was the first large British military operation of the Western Desert Campaign (1940–1943) during the Second World War. British, Empire and Commonwealth forces attacked Italian forces of the 10th Army (Marshal Rodolfo Graziani) in western Egypt and Cyrenaica, the eastern province of Libya, from December 1940 to February 1941.

The WDF swiftly defeated the Italians in their fortified posts and at Sidi Barrani and then exploited the success, forcing the rest of the 10th Army out of Egypt and capturing the ports along the Libyan coast. The 10th Army was cut off as it retreated towards Tripolitania and defeated at the Battle of Beda Fomm, the remnants being pursued to El Agheila on the Gulf of Sirte.

The WDF was unable to continue beyond El Agheila, due to worn out vehicles and the diversion in March 1941 of the best-equipped units in Operation Lustre for the Battle of Greece.

Background

10th Army

When war was declared, the 5th Army (General Italo Gariboldi) was in Tripolitania the western Libyan province and the 10th Army (General Mario Berti) was in Cyrenaica to the east. Once the French in Tunisia no longer posed a threat to Tripolitania, units of the 5th Army were used to reinforce the 10th Army. When Governor-General of Libya Italo Balbo was killed by friendly fire, Marshal Graziani took his place. Graziani expressed doubts about the capabilities of the large non-mechanized force to defeat the British, who though smaller in numbers were motorised. The XX Corps had the 60th Infantry Division "Sabratha" and the XXI Corps had the 1st CC.NN. Division "23 Marzo", the 2nd CC.NN. Division "28 Ottobre" and the 63rd Infantry Division "Cirene". XXII Corps had the 61st Infantry Division "Sirte" and XXIII Corps had the 4th CC.NN. Division "3 Gennaio" and the 64th Infantry Division "Catanzaro".

The new Libyan Divisions Group had the Maletti Group, the 1st Libyan Division (Major-General Luigi Sibille) and the 2nd Libyan Division (Major-General Armando Pescatori). The only non-infantry formation was the partially motorised and lightly armoured Maletti Group. The Maletti Group (General Pietro Maletti) was formed at Derna on 8 July 1940, with seven Libyan motorised infantry battalions, a company of Fiat M11/39 tanks, a company of L3/33 tankettes, motorised artillery and supply units, as the main motorised unit of the 10th Army.

Western Desert Force

From 14 December, troops of the 6th Australian Infantry Division (Major-General Iven Giffard Mackay), replaced the 4th Indian Division, which was sent to East Africa, less one brigade. The British had some fast Cruiser Mk I, Cruiser Mk II and Cruiser Mk III tanks with Ordnance QF 2-pounder guns, which were superior to Fiat M11/39 tanks. The British also had a battalion of Matilda II infantry tanks that while slow, were also equipped with the 2-pounder; the armour of the Matildas could not be penetrated by Italian anti-tank guns or field guns.

Border skirmishes

Italy declared war on Britain and France on 10 June 1940. During the next few months there were raids and skirmishes between Italian forces in Libya and British and Commonwealth forces in Egypt. On 12 June 1940, the Mediterranean Fleet bombarded Tobruk. Royal Air Force Blenheim bombers from 45, 55 and 211 squadrons, hit  with one bomb. On 19 June, the British submarine  fired two torpedoes at  but missed. The gunners on  then supported the local land-based anti-aircraft units and claimed 47 British aircraft shot down or damaged. The naval gunners also shot down a Savoia-Marchetti SM.79 aircraft and killed Italo Balbo, the Governor-General of Libya and Commander-in-chief of Italian forces in North Africa.

Prelude

E

On 13 September 1940, the Italian 10th Army advanced into Egypt in  E. As the Italians advanced, the small British force at Sollum withdrew to the main defensive position east of Mersa Matruh. The Italian advance was harassed by the 3rd Coldstream Guards, attached artillery and other units.

British plan

Following the Italian advance, Wavell ordered the commander of British Troops Egypt, Lieutenant-General Sir Henry Maitland Wilson, to plan a limited operation to push the Italians back. Operation Compass, for administrative reasons, was originally planned as a five-day raid but consideration was given to continuing the operation to exploit success. On 28 November, Wavell wrote to Wilson that,

The 7th Support Group was to observe the Italian camps on the escarpment around Sofafi, to prevent the garrisons from interfering, while the rest of the division and 4th Indian Division passed through the Sofafi–Nibeiwa gap. An Indian brigade and Infantry tanks of 7th Royal Tank Regiment (7th RTR) would attack Nibeiwa from the west, as the 7th Armoured Division protected their northern flank. Once Nibeiwa was captured, a second Indian brigade and the 7th RTR would attack the Tummars. Selby Force (3rd Battalion Coldstream Guards plus some artillery) from the Matruh garrison was to contain the enemy camp at Maktila on the coast and the Royal Navy would bombard Maktila and Sidi Barrani. Preparations were kept secret and only a few officers knew during the training exercise held from  that the objectives marked out near Matruh were replicas of Nibeiwa and Tummar; the troops were also told that a second exercise was to follow and did not know that the operation was real until 7 December, as they arrived at their jumping-off points.

Late on 8 December, an Italian reconnaissance aircrew reported that attack on Maktila and Nibeiwa was imminent but Maletti was not informed. On 9 December, the 1st Libyan Division was at Maktila and the 2nd Libyan Division was at Tummar. The Maletti Group was at Nibiewa and the 4th CC.NN. Division "3 Gennaio" and the headquarters of the Libyan Corps were at Sidi Barrani. The 63rd Infantry Division "Cirene" and the headquarters of XXI Corps were at Sofafi and the 64th Infantry Division "Catanzaro" was at Buq Buq. The headquarters of the XXIII Corps and the 2nd CC.NN. Division "28 Ottobre" were in Sollum and Halfaya Pass respectively and the 62nd Infantry Division "Marmarica" was at Sidi Omar, south of Sollum. Berti was on sick leave and Gariboldi, the 1st CC.NN. Division "23 Marzo" and the 10th Army Headquarters were far back at Bardia. (By the time Berti arrived in Libya, so had the British.) Operation Compass (/Battle of the Marmarica) began on the night of  The Western Desert Force with the 7th Armoured Division, 4th Indian Division and the 16th Infantry Brigade advanced  to their start line. The RAF made attacks on Italian airfields and destroyed or damaged  on the ground. Maktila had been bombarded by the monitor  and the gunboat ; Sidi Barrani had been bombarded by the gunboat .

Battle of the Camps

Nibeiwa

At  on 9 December, a detachment of artillery commenced diversionary fire from the east on the fortified camp at Nibeiwa for an hour, which was held by the Maletti Group and at  the divisional artillery began a preliminary bombardment. The 11th Indian Infantry Brigade, with 7th RTR under command, attacked Nibeiwa from the north-west, which reconnaissance had established as the weakest sector. Large quantities of supplies were captured for British casualties of

The Tummars

The attack on Tummar West began at  after the 7th RTR had refuelled and artillery had bombarded the defences for an hour. Another approach from the north-west was made and tanks broke through the perimeter, followed twenty minutes later by the infantry. The defenders held out for longer than the Nibeiwa garrison but by  Tummar West was overrun except for the north-eastern corner. The tanks moved on to Tummar East, the greater part of which was captured by nightfall. The 4th Armoured Brigade had advanced to Azziziya, where the garrison of  surrendered and light patrols of the 7th Hussars pushed forward to cut the road from Sidi Barrani to Buq Buq, while armoured cars of the 11th Hussars ranged further west. The tanks of 7th Armoured Brigade were held in reserve ready to intercept an Italian counter-attack. The 2nd Libyan Division lost  and  killed,  and  wounded, with the survivors being taken prisoner.

Maktila

Unaware of the situation at the Tummars, Selby sent units to cut the western exits from Maktila but the 1st Libyan Division filtered through and escaped. Cruiser tanks of the 6th Royal Tank Regiment (6th RTR) arrived in a sandstorm and overran the Italians in the dunes at about  then joined Selby Force to continue the pursuit. The Italian defenders were caught at Sidi Barrani, in a pocket  backing on to the sea. When the British attacked again at dawn on 11 December, mass surrenders began everywhere, except at Point 90 where troops of the 2nd Libyan Division held out for a short time, after which  surrendered.

Sidi Barrani, Buq Buq and Sofafi

On 10 December, the 16th Infantry Brigade was brought forward from 4th Indian Division reserve and with part of the 11th Indian Brigade under command, advanced in lorries to attack Sidi Barrani. While moving across exposed ground, some casualties were incurred but with support from artillery and the 7th RTR, it was in position barring the south and south western exits to Sidi Barrani by  The British attacked at  supported by the divisional artillery and the town fell by nightfall; the remains of the two Libyan Divisions and the 4th CC.NN. Division "3 Gennaio" were trapped between the 16th Infantry Brigade and Selby Force. On 11 December, Selby Force and some tanks attacked and overran the 1st Libyan Division and by the evening, the 4th CC.NN Division "3 Gennaio" had also surrendered. On 11 December, the 7th Armoured Brigade was ordered out of reserve to relieve the 4th Armoured Brigade in the Buq Buq area, mop up and capture large numbers of men and guns. A patrol from the 7th Support Group entered Rabia and found it empty; the 63rd Infantry Division "Cirene" had withdrawn from Rabia and Sofafi overnight. An order to the 4th Armoured Brigade to cut them off west of Sofafi arrived too late and the Italians were able to retire along the escarpment and join Italian forces at Halfaya. Italian casualties were  killed,  wounded and

Exploitation

Over the next few days the 4th Armoured Brigade, on top of the escarpment and the 7th Armoured Brigade on the coast, attempted a pursuit but supply problems and the large number of prisoners (twenty times the number planned for) impeded the advance. Italian forces crowded along the coast road and retreating from Sidi Barrani and Buq Buq, were bombarded by Terror and the two gunboats, which fired on the Sollum area all day and most of the night of 11 December. Late on 12 December, the only Italian positions left in Egypt were the approaches to Sollum and the area of Sidi Omar.

The Italians had lost  and Libyan casualties, most taken prisoner,  and  against  casualties. On 7 December, Wellington bombers from Malta and Blenheim bombers from Egypt carried out raids on the Italian air bases at Castel Benito, Benina and El Adem, the attack on Castel Benito being particularly successful, with hits on five hangars and strafing runs which hit many Italian aircraft; the attacks continued until the end of the year.

Pursuit

Sollum, Halfaya and Fort Capuzzo

Exploitation continued by the two armoured brigades and the 7th Support Group, with the infantry of 16th Infantry Brigade (which had been detached from the 4th Indian Division) following up. By 15 December, Sollum and the Halfaya Pass had been captured and the British by-passed Italian garrisons further south in the desert. The 7th Armoured Division concentrated south-west of Bardia, waiting for the arrival of 6th Australian Division.

Bardia

The 6th Australian Division (Major General Iven Mackay) attacked the Italian XXIII Corps (Lieutenant-General [] Annibale Bergonzoli) at Bardia from 3 to 5 January 1941, assisted by air support, naval gunfire and artillery. The 16th Australian Infantry Brigade attacked at dawn from the west, where the defences were known to be weak. Sappers blew gaps in the barbed wire with Bangalore torpedoes, then filled in and broke down the sides of the anti-tank ditch with picks and shovels. The Australian infantry and 23 Matilda II tanks of the 7th RTR, overran the Italian defences and took  The 17th Australian Infantry Brigade exploited the breach made in the perimeter and pressed south, as far as a secondary line of defences known as the Switch Line. On the second day, the 16th Australian Infantry Brigade captured Bardia, cutting the fortress in two. Thousands of prisoners were taken and the remnants of the Italian garrison held only the northern and southernmost parts of the fortress. On the third day, the 19th Australian Infantry Brigade advanced south from Bardia, supported by artillery and the remaining six Matilda tanks. The 17th Australian Infantry Brigade attacked and the two brigades reduced the southern sector of the fortress. Italian casualties also included  and  wounded.

Capture of Tobruk

Derna–Mechili

The area east of the Jebel Akhdar mountains was garrisoned by XX Corps (Lieutenant-General Annibale Bergonzoli) with the 60th Infantry Division "Sabratha" and the Babini Group, which had  The tank force included  M.13/40 tanks, which needed ten days to be made battle-worthy but had been rushed forward anyway. The Sabratha Division held a line from Derna, along Wadi Derna to Mechili, with the Babini Group at Mechili, Giovanni Berta and Chaulan, guarding the flank and rear of the infantry. On 23 January, the 10th Army commander, General Giuseppe Tellera ordered a counter-attack against the British, to avoid an envelopment of XX Corps from the south. Next day, the Babini Group, with ten to fifteen of the new M.13/40s, attacked the 7th Hussars as they headed west to cut the Derna–Mechili track north of Mechili. The British swiftly retired, calling for help from the 2nd RTR, which complacently ignored the signals. The British lost several tanks and knocked out two M.13s, until eventually, the 2nd RTR mobilised, caught the Italian tanks sky-lined on a ridge and knocked out seven M.13s, for the loss of a cruiser and six light tanks.

To the north, the 2/11th Australian Battalion engaged the Sabratha Division and Bersaglieri companies of the Babini Group at Derna airfield, making slow progress against determined resistance. The 19th Australian Brigade began to arrive in the morning and Italian bombers and fighters attacked the Australians. The Italians swept the flat ground with field artillery and machine-guns, stopping the Australian advance  short of the objective. On 26 January, the 2/4th Australian Battalion cut the Derna–Mechili road and a company crossed Wadi Derna during the night against bold Italian counter-attacks. The Italians disengaged on the night of  before the garrison was trapped and rearguards of the Babini Group cratered roads, planted mines and booby-traps and managed to conduct several skilful ambushes, which slowed the British pursuit.

Battle of Beda Fomm

The 7th Armoured Division was dispatched to intercept the remnants of the 10th Army by moving through the desert, south of the Jebel Akhdar (Green Mountain) via Msus and Antelat, as the 6th Australian Division pursued the Italians along the coast road, north of the jebel. The terrain slowed the British tanks and Combe Force (Lieutenant-Colonel John Combe), a flying column of wheeled vehicles, was sent ahead across the chord of the jebel. Next day, the Italians attacked to break through the roadblock and continued to attack into 7 February. With British reinforcements arriving and the Australians pressing down the road from Benghazi, the remnants of the 10th Army surrendered. From Benghazi to Agedabia, the British took  captured  and

Desert operations

Giarabub, Kufra and Uweinat

The oasis of Giarabub was attacked in January 1941 and captured in March by the 6th Australian Cavalry Regiment and an Australian infantry battalion. Further south, on the far side of the Sand Sea, the oasis of Kufra was attacked by Free French from French Equatorial Africa, in concert with Long Range Desert Group (LRDG) patrols. (Kufra later fell after the two-month Capture of Kufra in March 1941.) Further west, on the border with Chad, the Italian base at Murzuk was raided in January, when a patrol of the new Long Range Patrol Unit and a local sheikh travelled  to rendezvous near Kayugi with a small Free French detachment. The force attacked Murzuk and destroyed three aircraft and a hangar; the French commander was killed, most of the Italians surrendered and several prisoners were taken. The raiders then shot up three forts and departed.

The base was the closest Italian outpost to Italian East Africa and an Italian raid from Uweinat on Wadi Halfa in Sudan was possible. Destruction of the dockyards and railway workshops and the sinking of vessels on the Nile could cut the communications between Khartoum and Cairo. British patrols visited Faya and rendezvoused with another French detachment with General Philippe Leclerc for an attack on Kufra. The British were strafed by aircraft and ambushed by armoured cars of an Italian Auto-Saharan Company, which destroyed several lorries. Kufra was captured by the French on 1 March and became the new LRDG base in April.

Aftermath

Analysis

The success of the 7th Armoured Division encouraged a belief in the Royal Tank Regiment that manoeuvre could win battles; the engagement with the Babini Group on 24 January, led to a conclusion that armoured divisions needed more artillery. No integration of tanks with infantry or the use of anti-tank guns offensively was considered necessary. The lack of cover in the desert encouraged dispersion to avoid air attack but this reduced firepower at the decisive point. Due to the exiguous nature of supply and transport, conservation during lulls also encouraged the use of "jock columns" (a small mobile force formed of a motorised infantry company, a field-gun battery and several armoured cars). The success of such columns against the Italians led to exaggerated expectations, which were confounded when German aircraft and better-equipped and -armed troops arrived in Libya. The 7th Armoured Division concluded that the defensive mentality of the Italians had justified the taking of exceptional risks, which would be unjustified against German troops.

Casualties
A far larger number of aircraft became non-operational due to damage, which could not be repaired quickly for lack of spare parts, a problem made worse by the increased use of explosive bullets by the Italians. (On 14 December, a raid on Bardia by nine Blenheims cost one aircraft shot down and seven damaged by explosive bullets.)

Subsequent operations

A week after the Italian surrender at Beda Fomm, the Defence Committee in London ordered Cyrenaica to be held with the minimum of forces and the surplus sent to Greece. In the WDF (now XIII Corps), the 6th Australian Division was fully equipped and had few losses to replace. The 7th Armoured Division had been operating for eight months, wearing out its mechanical equipment and was withdrawn to refit. Two regiments of the 2nd Armoured Division with the WDF were also worn out, leaving the division with only four tank regiments. The 6th Australian Division went to Greece in March, with a brigade group of the 2nd Armoured Division containing the best equipment. The remainder of the division and the new 9th Australian Division, minus two brigades and most of its transport sent to Greece, were replaced by two under-equipped brigades of the 7th Australian Division. The division took over in Cyrenaica, on the assumption that the Italians could not begin a counter-offensive until May, even with German reinforcements.

The 3rd Armoured Brigade of the 2nd Armoured Division was left in Cyrenaica comprising an under-strength light tank regiment, a second regiment using captured Italian tanks and from mid-March a cruiser tank regiment, also equipped with worn-out tanks. The 2nd Support Group had only one motor battalion, a field artillery regiment, one anti-tank battery and a machine-gun company; most of the divisional transport had been sent to Greece. A few thousand men of the 10th Army escaped the disaster in Cyrenaica but the 5th Army in Tripolitania had four divisions. On 25 March 1941, Graziani was replaced by Gariboldi.

Orders of battle

10th Army 

December 1940, detail taken from Montanari (1990) unless specified.
 Supreme Commander Italian Forces in North Africa, Marshal Rodolfo Graziani
 10th Army, General Italo Gariboldi, from 23 December General Giuseppe Tellera (Killed in action [KIA] 7 February 1941)

Libyan Divisions Group 
 Libyan Divisions Group, headquarters in Sidi Barrani General Sebastiano Gallina
 1st Libyan Division, at Al Maktilah (General Giovanni Cerio)
 1st Libyan Infantry Group, 3 × battalions, 1 × anti-tank company with 47/32 mod. 1935 anti-tank guns
 2nd Libyan Infantry Group, 3 × battalions, 1 × anti-tank company 47/32 mod. 1935 anti-tank guns
 1st Libyan Artillery Group, 2 × groups with 77/28 mod. 5 field guns
 II Mixed Engineer Battalion
 Attached units
 1 × group from the 2nd CC.NN. Division "28 Ottobre" with 75/27 mod. 11 field guns
 2 × batteries with 65/17 mod. 13 mountain guns
 1 × battery with 105/28 howitzers
 1 × gun company with 47/32 mod. 1935 anti-tank guns
 2nd Libyan Division, between Ras el Dai and Alam el Tummar (General Armando Pescatori)
 3rd Libyan Infantry Group, 4 × battalions, 1 × anti-tank company with 47/32 mod. 1935 anti-tank guns
 4th Libyan Infantry Group, 4 × battalions, 1 × anti-tank company 47/32 mod. 1935 anti-tank guns
 2nd Libyan Artillery Group, 2 × groups with 77/28 mod. 5 field guns
 I Mixed Engineer Battalion
 Attached units
 IX Tank Battalion "L", with L3/35 tankettes
 1 × group from the 2nd CC.NN. Division "28 Ottobre" with 75/27 mod. 11 field guns
 1 × group with 105/28 howitzers
 2 × batteries with 65/17 mod. 13 mountain guns
 1 × anti-tank company with 47/32 mod. 1935 anti-tank guns
 4th CC.NN. Division "3 Gennaio", in Sidi Barrani (General Fabio Merzari)
 228th CC.NN. Legion, 3 × battalions, 1 × battery with 65/17 mod. 13 mountain guns, 1 × company with 81 mm mortars
 250th CC.NN. Legion "Indomita", 3 × battalions, 1 × battery with 65/17 mod. 13 mountain guns, 1 × company with 81 mm mortars
 204th Artillery Regiment, 2 × groups with 75/27 mod. 11 field guns, 1 × group with 100/17 mod. 1914 howitzers
 IV CC.NN. Machine Gun Battalion
 IV CC.NN. Mixed Engineer Battalion
 4th CC.NN. Anti-Tank Company, with 47/32 mod. 1935 anti-tank guns
 Attached units
 1 × artillery group with 105/28 howitzers
 1 × artillery group with 75/27 C.K. anti-aircraft guns

XXI Corps 
 XXI Corps, headquarters in Buq Buq General Carlo Spatocco
 XX Tank Battalion "L", with L3/35 tankettes
 LXIII Tank Battalion "L", with L3/35 tankettes
 X Machine Gun Squadrons Group
 1 × motorcyclists company
 63rd Infantry Division "Cirene", at Alam el Rabia and Bir Bofafi (General Alessandro de Guidi)
 157th Infantry Regiment, 3 × battalions, 1 × battery with 65/17 mod. 13 mountain guns, 1 × company with 81 mm mortars
 158th Infantry Regiment, 3 × battalions, 1 × battery with 65/17 mod. 13 mountain guns, 1 × company with 81 mm mortars
 45th Artillery Regiment, 2 × groups with 75/27 mod. 11 field guns, 1 × group with 100/17 mod. 1914 howitzers
 LXIII Machine Gun Battalion
 LXIII Mixed Engineer Battalion
 Attached units:
 I/21st Artillery Group, with 105/28 howitzers
 III/12th Artillery Group, with 100/17 mod. 1914 howitzers
 III/21st Artillery Group, with 75/27 mod. 11 field guns
 2 × batteries with 65/17 mod. 13 mountain guns
 202nd CC.NN. Anti-Tank Company, with 47/32 mod. 1935 anti-tank guns
 64th Infantry Division "Catanzaro", at Alam Salamus (General Giuseppe Amico)
 141st Infantry Regiment, 3 × battalions, 1 × battery with 65/17 mod. 13 mountain guns, 1 × company with 81 mm mortars
 142nd Infantry Regiment, 3 × battalions, 1 × battery with 65/17 mod. 13 mountain guns, 1 × company with 81 mm mortars
 203rd Artillery Regiment, 2 × groups with 75/27 mod. 11 field guns, 1 × group with 100/17 mod. 1914 howitzers
 LXIV Machine Gun Battalion
 LXIV Mixed Engineer Battalion
 64th Anti-Tank Company, with 47/32 mod. 1935 anti-tank guns
 Maletti Group, at Alam Nibeiwa and Alam el Iktufa (General Pietro Maletti, KIA 9 December 1940)
 I, V, XVII, XIX Libyan infantry battalions
 I Auto-Saharan Battalion
 II Tank Battalion "M" 4th Tank Infantry Regiment, with 37 × M11/39 tanks
 1 × group with 65/17 mod. 13 mountain guns
 1 × group with 75/27 mod. 11 field guns
 2 × anti-tank companies with 47/32 mod. 1935 anti-tank guns
 1 × company with 81 mm mortars
 1 × battery with 105/28 howitzers

XXIII Corps 
 XXIII Corps, headquarters in Sollum, General Annibale Bergonzoli
 1st CC.NN. Division "23 Marzo", at Bardia (General Francesco Antonelli)
 219th CC.NN. Legion, 3 × battalions, 1 × battery with 65/17 mod. 13 mountain guns, 1 × company with 81 mm mortars
 233rd CC.NN. Legion, 3 × battalions, 1 × battery with 65/17 mod. 13 mountain guns, 1 × company with 81 mm mortars
 201st CC.NN. Artillery Regiment, 2 × groups with 75/27 mod. 11 field guns, 1 × group with 100/17 mod. 1914 howitzers
 CCI CC.NN. Machine Gun Battalion
 CCI CC.NN. Mixed Engineer Battalion
 201st CC.NN. Anti-Tank Company, with 47/32 mod. 1935 anti-tank guns
 Attached units:
 LXI Tank Battalion "L", with L3/35 tankettes
 2nd CC.NN. Division "28 Ottobre", at Sollum and Halfaya Pass (General Francesco Argentino)
 231st CC.NN. Legion, 3 × battalions, 1 × battery with 65/17 mod. 13 mountain guns, 1 × company with 81mm mortars
 238th CC.NN. Legion, 3 × battalions, 1 × battery with 65/17 mod. 13 mountain guns, 1 × company with 81mm mortars
 202nd CC.NN. Artillery Regiment, 1 × group with 100/17 mod. 1914 howitzers, 2 × groups detached to other divisions
 CCII CC.NN. Machine Gun Battalion
 CCII CC.NN. Mixed Engineer Battalion
 62nd Infantry Division "Marmarica", at Sidi Omar and Gabr du Fares (General Ruggero Tracchia)
 115th Infantry Regiment, 3 × battalions, 1 × battery with 65/17 mod. 13 mountain guns, 1 × company with 81mm mortars
 116th Infantry Regiment, 3 × battalions, 1 × battery with 65/17 mod. 13 mountain guns, 1 × company with 81mm mortars
 44th Artillery Regiment, 2 × groups with 75/27 mod. 11 field guns, 1 × group with 100/17 mod. 1914 howitzers
 LXII Machine Gun Battalion
 LXII Mixed Engineer Battalion
 62nd Anti-Tank Company, with 47/32 mod. 1935 anti-tank guns
 Attached units:
 LXII Tank Battalion "L", with L3/35 tankettes
 2 × batteries with 65/17 mod. 13 mountain guns
 2 × anti-tank companies with 47/32 mod. 1935 anti-tank guns

XXII Army Corps (Reserve) 
 XXII Corps, headquarters in Tobruk General Enrico Pitassi Mannella 
 61st Infantry Division "Sirte", at Gambut (General Vincenzo della Mura)
 69th Infantry Regiment, 3 × battalions, 1 × battery with 65/17 mod. 13 mountain guns
 70th Infantry Regiment, 3 × battalions, 1 × battery with 65/17 mod. 13 mountain guns
 43rd Artillery Regiment, 2 × groups with 75/27 mod. 11 field guns, 1 × group with 100/17 mod. 1914 howitzers
 LXI Mixed Engineer Battalion
 Attached units:
 I Libyan Paratroopers Battalion "Diavoli neri"
 II Paratroopers Battalion 
 Artillery Command
 10th Army Corps Artillery Regiment
 20th Army Corps Artillery Regiment
 Babini Group at Marsa Lucch (General Valentino Babini)
 I Tank Battalion "M" 4th Tank Infantry Regiment, with 37 × M11/39 tanks
 III Tank Battalion "M" 32nd Tank Infantry Regiment, with 37 × M13/40 tanks
 XXI Tank Battalion "L", with L3/35 tankettes (disbanded at Tobruk late in December 1940, personnel used to raise the XXI Tank Battalion "M" at Benghazi in January 1941)
 LX Tank Battalion "L", with L3/35 tankettes
 1 × Bersaglieri motorcycle battalion
 1 × group with 75/27 mod. 11 field guns
 1 × group with 100/17 mod. 1914 howitzers

Cyrenaica military garrisons 
 Tobruk
 Royal Italian Army:
 XXI Libyan Coastal Battalion
 2 × mixed engineer units
 2 × anti-aircraft groups with 20/65 mod. 35 anti-aircraft guns
 Royal Italian Navy:
 cruiser San Giorgio
 10 × coastal batteries
 
 Infantry: 2,300 men
 Artillery: 2 × groups
 Bardia
 Royal Italian Army:
 1 × fortification machine gun squadrons group
 3 × anti-tank companies with 47/32 mod. 1935 anti-tank guns
 V Coastal Fortification Group
 XVII Group, with 75/27 mod. 11 field guns
 2 × batteries with 75/27 mod. 11 field guns
 
 Infantry: 2,500 men
 Artillery: 17 × batteries
 Giarabub
 Royal Italian Army:
 1 × motorised Libyan machine-gun company
 1 × fusiliers company
 4 × Libyan fortification machine-gun companies
 1 × section with 2 × 65/17 mod. 13 mountain guns
 1 × platoon with 4 × 20/65 mod. 35 anti-aircraft guns
 1/2 × anti-tank company with 6 × 47/32 mod. 1935 anti-tank guns

Libyan Sahara garrisons 
 Kufra Oasis
 2 × Libyan fortification machine gun companies
 1 × Auto-Saharan Company
 1 × Auto-Saharan Company with 20/65 mod. 35 anti-aircraft guns
 Jalu Oasis
 1 × machine gun battalion
 1 × Libyan reserve battalion
 1 × Auto-Saharan Company
 1 × anti-tank company with 47/32 mod. 1935 anti-tank guns
 1 × battery with 20/65 mod. 35 anti-aircraft guns

The 10th Army in Egypt consisted of 80,000 troops, 250 guns and 125 tanks.

Reinforcements 
These reinforcements reached the 10th Army after the start of Operation Compass (data taken from Montanari, 1990).
 60th Infantry Division "Sabratha", took up positions at Derna (General Guido Della Bona)
 85th Infantry Regiment, 3 × battalions, 1 × battery with 65/17 mod. 13 mountain guns, 1 × company with 81 mm mortars
 86th Infantry Regiment, 3 × battalions, 1 × company with 81 mm mortars
 42nd Artillery Regiment, 2 × groups with 75/27 mod. 11 field guns
 LXIV Machine Gun Battalion
 LXIV Mixed Engineer Battalion
 Attached units:
 60th Bersaglieri Motorcycle Company
 XVIII Libyan Infantry Battalion
 1 × machine gun battalion
 1 × group with 75/27 mod. 11 field guns
 3 × anti-tank companies with 47/32 mod. 1935 anti-tank guns
 6 × batteries with 65/17 mod. 13 mountain guns
 4 × batteries with 20/65 mod. 35 anti-aircraft guns
 1 × chemical company
 Bignami Column, took up positions at Mechili (General Mario Bignami, organised 22 January 1940)
 10th Artillery Regiment, 1 × group with 75/27 mod. 11 field guns (from the 25th Infantry Division "Bologna")
 VI Tank Battalion "M" 33rd Tank Infantry Regiment, with 37 × M13/40 tanks
 XXI Tank Battalion "M", with 37 × M13/40 tanks (Raised with personnel from the disbanded XXI Tank Battalion "L" in January 1941)
 XXV Motorised Machine Gun Battalion (from the 25th Infantry Division "Bologna")
 XXVII Motorised Machine Gun Battalion (from the 27th Infantry Division "Brescia")
 10th Bersaglieri Regiment
 XVI, XXXIV, XXXV Bersaglieri battalions
 1 × battery with 65/17 mod. 13 mountain guns
 1 × company with 81 mm mortars
 V Tank Battalion "M" 32nd Tank Infantry Regiment, with 37 × M13/40 tanks, joined the Babini Group (Special Armoured Brigade)
 VII Anti-aircraft Group, with 75/46 mod. 34 anti-aircraft guns

Western Desert Force 
Western Desert Force, 9 December 1940 Details taken from Christie (1999) and Montanari (1990) unless specified.
 Commander-in-Chief, Middle East (General Sir Archibald Wavell)
 Western Desert Force (Lieutenant-General Richard O'Connor)
 1st Battalion, Royal Sussex (7th Indian Infantry Brigade battalion)
 4th Battalion, 11th Sikh Regiment (7th Indian Infantry Brigade battalion)
 7th Royal Tank Regiment (Until 11 December, then 6th Australian Division)
 2nd Heavy Anti-Aircraft Regiment Royal Artillery
 7th Heavy Field Regiment Royal Artillery
 104th (Essex Yeomanry) Regiment, Royal Horse Artillery
 6 × light anti-aircraft batteries
 7th Armoured Division (Major General Michael O'Moore Creagh)
 4th Armoured Brigade (Brigadier J. A. L. Caunter)
 7th Queen's Own Hussars (−1 troop)
 2nd Royal Tank Regiment
 6th Royal Tank Regiment
 7th Armoured Brigade (Brigadier Hugh E. Russell)
 3rd The King's Own Hussars
 8th King's Royal Irish Hussars
 1st Royal Tank Regiment
 Support Group (Infantry Brigade) (Brigadier William Gott)
 1st Battalion King's Royal Rifle Corps
 2nd Battalion Rifle Brigade
 1st Regiment Royal Horse Artillery
 4th Regiment Royal Horse Artillery
 11th Hussars (Prince Albert's Own) (Reconnaissance)
 3rd Regiment Royal Horse Artillery
 106th (Lancashire Yeomanry) Regiment, Royal Horse Artillery (2 × anti-tank batteries, 2 × anti-aircraft batteries)
 2nd (Cheshire) Field Squadron Royal Engineers
 141st Field Park Royal Engineers
 2 × Royal Air Force Regiment armoured car companies
 4th Indian Division (Major General Noel Beresford-Peirse, until 11 December)
 5th Indian Infantry Brigade (Brigadier Wilfrid Lewis Lloyd)
 1st Battalion, Royal Fusiliers
 3rd Battalion, 1st Punjab Regiment
 4th Battalion, 6th Rajputana Rifles
 1× anti-tank company
 11th Indian Infantry Brigade (Brigadier Reginald Savory)
 1st Battalion, 6th Rajputana Rifles
 2nd Battalion, Queen's Own Cameron Highlanders
 4th Battalion, 7th Rajput Regiment
 1 × anti-tank company
 16th British Infantry Brigade (Brigadier Cyril Lomax, until 11 December)
 2nd Battalion, Queen's Regiment
 1st Battalion, Argyll & Sutherland Highlanders
 2nd Battalion, Leicestershire Regiment
 Central India Horse (21st King George V's Own Horse) (Reconnaissance)
 1st Battalion, Northumberland Fusiliers (machine gunners, 1 × company)
 1st Field Regiment Royal Artillery
 25th Field Regiment Royal Artillery
 31st Field Regiment Royal Artillery
 4th Field Squadron Royal Engineers
 12th Field Squadron Royal Engineers
 18th Field Squadron Royal Engineers
 21st Field Squadron Royal Engineers
 11th Field Park Royal Engineers
 7th Indian Infantry Brigade (Brigadier Harold Briggs, Mersa Matruh garrison, two battalions detached, until 11 December)
 2nd Battalion, 11th Sikh Regiment (detached from)
 Selby Force (Brigadier Arthur Selby)
 3rd Battalion, Coldstream Guards
 1 × company Northumberland Fusiliers (Machine Gunners)
 1 × company, 1st Battalion, South Staffordshire Regiment
 1 × company, 1st Battalion, Cheshire Regiment
 1 × platoon, 1st Battalion Durham Light Infantry
 1 × troop, 7th Queen's Own Hussars
 1 × section, 8th Field Regiment Royal Artillery
 1 × section, 107th (South Nottinghamshire Hussars) Regiment, Royal Horse Artillery
 6th Australian Division (Major General Iven Mackay, from 11 December)
 16th Australian Infantry Brigade (Brigadier Arthur Allen)
 2/1st Australian Battalion
 2/2nd Australian Battalion
 2/3rd Australian Battalion
 17th Australian Infantry Brigade (Brigadier Stanley Savige)
 2/5th Australian Battalion
 2/6th Australian Battalion
 2/7th Australian Battalion
 19th Australian Infantry Brigade (Brigadier Horace Robertson)
 2/4th Australian Battalion
 2/8th Australian Battalion
 2/11th Australian Battalion
 6th Division Reconnaissance Regiment (Reconnaissance)
 2/1st Field Regiment
 2/2nd Field Regiment
 2/3rd Field Regiment
 2/1st Field Company, Royal Australian Engineers
 2/2nd Field Company, Royal Australian Engineers
 2/3rd Field Company, Royal Australian Engineers

The Western Desert Force consisted of about 31,000 soldiers, 120 guns, 275 tanks and sixty armoured cars. The 4th Indian Division was exchanged with the 6th Australian Division for the pursuit after the first part of Operation Compass.

See also

 North African campaign timeline
 List of British military equipment of World War II
List of Australian military equipment of World War II
List of Italian military equipment in World War II
Military history of Italy during World War II

Notes

Footnotes

References
Books
 
 
 
 
 
 
 
 
 
 
 
 
 
 
 
 
  published in 

Theses

 

Websites

Further reading
Books

 
 
 
 
 
 
 
 
 
 
 
 
 

Journals

 

Newspapers

  published in 
  published in 

Reports

 

Theses

 

Websites

External links

 La battaglia della Marmarica
 A few memories of Corporal Nazzareno Ganino of the Sabratha Division
 The Italian Army in Egypt during World War II
 The Engagement at Derna, AWM 
 Animated Map of Operation Compass
 Operation Compass Desert War.net

1940 in Egypt
1941 in Egypt
1940 in Italy
1941 in Italy
1940 in Libya
1941 in Libya
Battles of World War II involving Australia
Battles and operations of World War II involving India
Battles of World War II involving Italy
Battles of World War II involving France
Compass
Military history of India during World War II
Military operations involving the United Kingdom
Western Desert campaign
Libya in World War II
Egypt in World War II
World War II operations and battles of Europe
Military history of Italy during World War II
December 1940 events
January 1941 events
February 1941 events